Aaroniella badonneli is a species of loving barklouse in the family Philotarsidae. It is found in Europe (Italy, Russia and France), Northern Asia (excluding China), as well as Canada and the United States.

Description
Females deliver as many as 38 eggs.

Name
The species is named after André Badonnel, a French entomologist active in the 20th century.

References

Further reading

 

Psocomorpha
Insects of Asia
Insects of Europe
Insects of North America
Insects described in 1950